Beauvoir-en-Lyons is a commune in the Seine-Maritime department in the Normandy region in northern France.

Geography

Population

Places of interest
 The church of St.Nicolas, dating from the eighteenth century.
 The remains of a 12th-century castle.
 Traces of the abbey of Saint-Laurent.
 The two châteaux at Bos-Hyons at Routieux.

See also
Communes of the Seine-Maritime department

References

Communes of Seine-Maritime